Buzmeyin Sport Complex is a stadium in Büzmeýin District, Ashgabat, Turkmenistan. It is currently used mostly for football matches. It has a capacity of 10,000 people.  It is the home of Ýokary Liga club FC Altyn Asyr.

It was called Abadan Sport Complex until 2018 year.

History 
The sports complex opened in June 2009 in Abadan city. Construction works carried out by Turkish company ALP-SAN Inşaat. The project cost $20 million. It also hosted some matches for 2010 Turkmenistan President's Cup.

In 2018, the Abadan District was renamed to Büzmeýin District, along with this the name of the stadium was changed to Buzmeyin Sport Complex.

Since the fall of 2021, the stadium has become the home stadium for FC Altyn Asyr.

References

External links
 Stadium pictures
 Project 

Football venues in Turkmenistan